Jerry Porter (born July 14, 1978) is a former American football wide receiver. He was drafted by the Oakland Raiders in the second round of the 2000 NFL Draft, after playing college football at West Virginia.  He has also played for the Jacksonville Jaguars and in 2011, attempted a comeback with the Montreal Alouettes of the Canadian Football League.

Early years
Porter attended Coolidge High School in Washington D.C., and was a star in football, basketball, baseball, and track. In football, he was a Blue Chip All-American selection and also won All-State honors. He was often called "Superman" by the West Virginia scouts, because he could play quarterback, wide receiver, fullback, halfback, defensive end, and defensive back during three varsity seasons. He was also reported to possess a 40-inch vertical jump, ability to throw a football 80 yards with one hand and 50 yards with his other while on his knees, and run a 4.4 40 yard dash.

College career
Porter came into West Virginia as a freshman, and coach Don Nehlen was uncertain of his final position. Porter was an All-Big East selection as an all-purpose back.

As a freshman, he saw action as a free safety in the first five games and filled in as the emergency quarterback against Rutgers, then finished the second half of the season as a wide receiver. For the season he recorded 28 tackles and an interception that was returned 68 yards for a touchdown. He also blocked a kick and recorded 311 yards and four touchdowns receiving as well. As a sophomore, he caught 13 passes for 280 yards and three touchdowns. As a junior, Porter started every game at free-safety, recording five interceptions.

Professional career

Oakland Raiders
Porter was drafted in 2000 during the second round by the Oakland Raiders. For three years, from 2000 to 2003, Porter was looked to as a third receiver behind veterans Tim Brown and Jerry Rice. Porter's best season came in 2004, when he recorded 998 yards and 9 touchdowns from quarterback Rich Gannon.

During the 2004 season, Porter was basically the starting receiver in front of Rice. Porter recorded a career-high 998 yards off of 64 receptions and 9 touchdowns for the season, the best of his career. However, the Raiders finished the season 5–11 and veteran quarterback Rich Gannon retired after suffering a serious neck injury.

With Jerry Rice's retirement after the 2004 season, it looked as if Porter would be new quarterback Kerry Collins' primary receiver. But just before the NFL Draft, the Raiders traded linebacker Napoleon Harris and draft picks for all-star receiver Randy Moss. With Moss on team, Porter would have the role as the secondary receiver. Even though he was not the primary receiver, he still managed to record a 942-yard, 5 touchdown season (2nd best of his career).

Entering the 2006 season, Porter publicly voiced his dissatisfaction with newly hired head coach Art Shell, and during training camp, demanded to be traded. Porter's conflict with Shell occurred very early in training camp, when Shell announced that champagne would no longer be allowed at the training facility. In addition to his public complaints, he reportedly parked in owner Al Davis's personal parking spot. As a result of his attitude, Coach Shell deactivated him "until further notice".

During his suspension, Porter was reportedly seen "laughing and pumping his fist" on the sidelines when teammate Aaron Brooks was sacked for the 7th time by the San Diego Chargers. He later denied these allegations, saying that he was not paying attention to the game and was interacting with fans in the seats.

Having still not played in a game in 2006, Porter was officially suspended/inactivated without pay for four games (the maximum allowable) by Coach Shell on October 15 for "conduct detrimental to the team" after he made disparaging and disrespectful remarks during a regular team practice. When the suspension was announced the NFL Players Association filed a grievance on Porter's behalf, and the Raiders reduced the suspension to two games on the 25th and he was allowed to return to practice. He dressed for and played in his first game of 2006 on October 29 – a Raiders home win over the Pittsburgh Steelers – during which he recorded one catch for 19 yards.

With Moss traded to the New England Patriots and Art Shell fired, Porter became the primary receiver on the Raiders in 2007.

Jacksonville Jaguars
On February 29, 2008, Porter was signed by the Jacksonville Jaguars to a six-year contract worth $30 million. The contract contained $10 million in guaranteed money. In May, he underwent surgery on his hamstring. He missed the rest of training camp and that preseason, and should have been back for the season opener against the Tennessee Titans. However, he did not play until the fourth game of the season in a 30–27 win over the Houston Texans, when he had a reception for 6 yards. He recorded no stats for the following three games, before totaling two catches for 38 yards in a loss to the Cincinnati Bengals in week 9. He finished the season with 11 receptions for 181 yards and a touchdown in 10 games. On February 11, 2009, Porter was cut by the Jaguars.

Current status
Porter was unsigned throughout the 2009 season. The former Jaguar tried out for the Washington Redskins following the season but was not signed to a contract and was not invited to any NFL team's 2010 training camp.

On February 15, 2011 the CFL's Montreal Alouettes signed Porter to a two-year contract. However, Porter tore his Achilles tendon in training camp, requiring season-ending surgery. He was subsequently released by the Alouettes.

NFL career statistics

References

External links
'Eers in Pros Blog Profile

1978 births
Living people
American football wide receivers
Jacksonville Jaguars players
Oakland Raiders players
Players of American football from Washington, D.C.
West Virginia Mountaineers football players
Ed Block Courage Award recipients